Soledad de Graciano Sánchez, formerly Soledad Diez Gutiérrez, is the second-largest city of the state of San Luis Potosí in Mexico. It lies adjacent to the east side of the state's capital city of San Luis Potosí in the west-central part of the state. The city is the municipal seat of the municipality of the same name. The city had a 2020 Census population of 310,192, while the municipality's population was 332,072.

History
The municipality of Soledad de Graciano Sanchez is located in the state of San Luis Potosí, Mexico.  The current territory of the municipality of Soledad was occupied during the pre-Hispanic era by hunter groups known as the Guachichil. Originally founded as Los Ranchos, locals built a hermitage to venerate the Virgen de la Soledad. The place was renamed Ranchos de Nuestra Señora de la Soledad in 1758 and then Villa de la Soledad in 1827.

Food
The most common local dish is enchiladas potosinas.

Economy
There are a total of 51,637 households in Soledad de Graciano Sanchez. Of these homes, 51,175 are normal houses or apartments. 

Population percentage (over 12 years) economically active: 56.51% (73.11% of men and 40.90% of women were working or looking for work)

Percentage of the active population that is employed: 94.05% (92.86% of men and 96.03% of economically active women are employed)

Culture
The municipal culture of Soledad de Graciano Sanchez is dibujar una sonrisa which means to draw a smile. This program is spread around hospitals, rehabilitation clinics, asylums, homes, nurseries, among others. Through this program there is an artistic festival composed mainly of clowns, who provide a special show to children and adults who are in hospitals or people who are sick from home, retirement homes for the elderly with disabilities and health institutions. These clowns visit once a week.

Annual cultural event
An event that happens every year is “La Feria Nacional de la Enchilada” in this event the whole town of Soledad gets together in their “jardin” which is a small park. The community gathers here where they will find people who come from all over Mexico to sell jewelry, arts, and others. People get to enjoy of their favorite plate enchiladas potosinas and try different ones. Kids get to enjoy the rides, face painting, and small carnival games. At the end of the event people go to the stage where famous artists put on a show for them.

Climate
Summers in Soledad de Graciano Sanchez are short and hot, the winters are short, cool and dry it is partly cloudy throughout the year. During the summer which are the months of May through July are the hottest days in this town. Throughout the year the temperature varies from 5 °C to 29 °C and rarely drops below 1 °C or rises above 33 °C.  The average percentage of the sky covered with clouds varies considerably during the course of the year. The wet season lasts 4.3 months from May 25 to October 3, with a probability of more than 21% that a certain day will be a wet day.

Geography
The municipality of Soledad de Graciano Sánchez it represents 0.41% of the surface of its state (San Luis Potosí).

Sister city:  Burlington, North Carolina, USA

References

External links

Ayuntamiento de Soledad de Graciano Sánchez Official website

Municipalities of San Luis Potosí